Pakaudi Lal Kol is an Indian politician and was member of the 15th and 17th Lok Sabha. He represented the Robertsganj parliamentary constituency of Uttar Pradesh.

Career 
He has joined Apna Dal (Sonelal) on 27 March 2019 & is contesting the 17th Lok Sabha election from Robertsganj seat as an Apna Dal (Sonelal) candidate with the support of Bharatiya Janata Party.

Pakauri Lal is Under Matriculate by education. He was an agriculturist before joining politics.

Posts held

See also

List of members of the 15th Lok Sabha
List of members of the 17th Lok Sabha

References 

India MPs 2009–2014
Living people
1952 births
Apna Dal (Sonelal) politicians
Samajwadi Party politicians
Lok Sabha members from Uttar Pradesh
People from Mirzapur
Uttar Pradesh MLAs 2002–2007
India MPs 2019–present
Indian Hindus